San Pablo is a small village located in the Stann Creek District of Belize.

Geography
The landscape surrounding the village includes jungle and banana farms.

Demographics
According to 2000 census, the village is home to 300 permanent residents. 2014 population estimate of San Pablo Village is 280. Many of the residents are Q'eqchi' and speak the Q'eqchi' language, Spanish, and some English.

References

Populated places in Stann Creek District
Stann Creek West